Seydiköy can refer to:

 Seydiköy, Eldivan
 Seydiköy, Keşan
 Seydiköy, former name of Gaziemir, İzmir Province, Turkey